Geeseytown is an unincorporated community and census-designated place (CDP) in Blair County, Pennsylvania, United States. It was first listed as a CDP prior to the 2020 census.

The CDP is in central Blair County, in the western part of Frankstown Township. U.S. Route 22 passes through the community, leading southwest  to Hollidaysburg and northeast  to Canoe Creek. Geeseytown is on the north side of the valley of the Frankstown Branch Juniata River, one of the main headwater branches of the Juniata River which leads east to the Susquehanna.

Demographics

References 

Census-designated places in Blair County, Pennsylvania
Census-designated places in Pennsylvania